The De Tomaso Longchamp is a grand tourer which was produced by the Italian automaker De Tomaso from 1972 to 1989.

History

The Longchamp was derived from the De Tomaso Deauville four-door saloon, using a shorter wheelbase chassis with the same suspension, engine and transmission. The same platform underpinned the Maserati Kyalami grand tourer and the Maserati Quattroporte III saloon as Maserati was owned by De Tomaso at the time. The Deauville and the Longchamp were the only front engine production cars produced by De Tomaso. The Longchamp was first exhibited at the 1972 Turin Motor Show and was initially offered only as a 2-door 2+2 coupé. It was designed by Tom Tjaarda of Ghia and was influenced by his previous Lancia Marica prototype. The taillights were the same units as were used for the Alfa Romeo 1750/2000 saloon. The headlights and front indicators are from the Ford Consul/Granada. The name Longchamp is likely a reference to the Longchamp Racecourse in Paris and/or Longchamps, Buenos Aires, a city near de Tomaso company founder Alejandro de Tomaso's birthplace.

The Longchamp featured a long and wide hood to accommodate the American power train, i.e. the 351 cubic inch (5,769 cc) Ford Cleveland V8. The 351 Cleveland, a popular and very potent engine in early 1970s Ford muscle cars, was the same unit used in the Pantera. After Ford stopped manufacturing the 351 Cleveland V8 in the US, De Tomaso sourced the engines from Ford Australia. The standard gearbox was a three-speed Ford C-6 Cruise-o-Matic automatic transmission; however around 17 cars were equipped with a five-speed ZF manual transmission. The suspension was independent front and rear wishbone unit equipped with coil springs. Steering was power assisted rack and pinion and the car came with vented disc brakes all around with the rear brake discs being positioned inboard. The interior of the car was quite luxurious and it was almost fully upholstered in leather, although the use of Ford sourced parts (steering wheel, gear shift) took away somewhat of the luxurious impression.

Development
Production of the Series 1 began in 1973. For the 1980 model year, the modernised Series 2 was introduced, with slight modifications occurring later as well. 

A sporty GTS variant was introduced at the 1980 Turin Motor Show, featuring wider wheels and flared wheel arches. and minor suspension setting differences to better utilise the wider Campagnolo wheels with Pirelli P7 tyres. A Longchamp cabriolet variant ("Spyder") was also introduced alongside the GTS. It was made by Carrozerria Pavesi of Milan, and a small number of cars were built to GTS specifications. Pavesi also converted a number of older coupés to Spyders.

After supplies of American-built 351 V8s dried up, De Tomaso began sourcing their engines from Australia, to where the production line had been transferred. The engines were tuned in Switzerland before being installed, and were available with power outputs of 270, 300, or 330 PS (199, 221, or 243 kW). In the eighties another version also appeared, the GTS/E. This was the top-of-the-line version, fitted with twin round headlights and extra spoilers, skirts, and a rear wing.

A total of 409 cars were built (395 coupés and 14 spyders) between 1972 and 1989, with only a couple of cars per year built during the last years. The vast majority are of Series 1 specifications. Some claim that production actually came to an end in 1986, with later cars being sold from stock. The Maserati Kyalami and Maserati Quattroporte III, which were also developed from the chassis, and conceived just as Alejandro de Tomaso took over Maserati, was very similar i.e. mechanically virtually identical to the Longchamp. The Narrative derivatives however used a Maserati V8, rather than the Ford unit favoured by De Tomaso.

Gallery

Notes

External links

Longchamp
Coupés
Convertibles
1980s cars
Cars introduced in 1972
Grand tourers